The 41st edition of the annual Vuelta a Venezuela was held from August 30 to September 12, 2004. The stage race started in Puerto la Cruz, and ended in Maracaibo.

Stages

2004-08-30: Puerto la Cruz — Puerto la Cruz (105 km)

2004-08-31: Barcelona — Punta de Mata (148.2 km)

2004-09-01: Maturín Circuito (136 km)

2004-09-02: Santa Bárbara de Tapirín — Paríaguan (184.8 km)

2004-09-03: Paríaguan — Valle de la Pascua (164.7 km)

2004-09-04: Chaguaramas — San Juan de Los Morros (184 km) 
 Stage 6 result nullified after accident in final kilometre

2004-09-05: San Juan de Los Morros — Los Guayos (113.2 km)

2004-09-06: Valencia — San Felipe (155.3 km)

2004-09-07: San Felipe — Chivacoa (32 km)

2004-09-07: San Felipe Circuito (91.2 km)

2004-09-08: Yaritagua — Carora (118.2 km)

2004-09-09: Carora — El Dividive (143.1 km)

2004-09-10: Valera Circuito (116.0 km)

2004-09-11: Valera — Cabimas (177.9 km)

2004-09-12: Circuito Maracaibo (118.3 km)

Final classification

Teams 

Lotería del Táchira A

Gob Zulia Alc Cabimas A

Triple Gordo Gob Lara A

PDVSA – PDV Anzoátegui A

PDVSA Norte Maturin A

Alc Pariaguan Anzoátegui

Alc Tinaco Cojedes

Loteria del Táchira B

Gob Zulia Alc Cabimas C

Colombia Selle Italia

Kino Táchira

PDVSA PDV Anzoátegui B

Dos Pinos Costa Rica

Colombian National Team

Grefusa Altecar Chidutani

Gob Trujillo CTD Café Flor de Patri

Jugos Prolaca Fundadeporte Carabobo

Alc Los Guayos Carabobo

Gob Zulia Alc Cabimas B

Triple Gordo Gob Lara B

Farara Tours Gob Amazonas

ACT Snow Valley USA

PDVSA Norte Maturin B

PDVSA Norte Maturin C

References 
 cyclingnews

Vuelta a Venezuela
Venezuela
Vuelta Venezuela